Helen Hilderley is a British Paralympic athlete. In 1984, she won one silver medal and three bronze medals in athletics at the 1984 Summer Paralympics.

She also competed in archery and she won the gold medal in the women's double FITA round division 3 event.

References

External links 
 

Living people
Year of birth missing (living people)
Place of birth missing (living people)
Paralympic gold medalists for Great Britain
Paralympic silver medalists for Great Britain
Paralympic bronze medalists for Great Britain
Paralympic medalists in archery
Paralympic medalists in athletics (track and field)
Athletes (track and field) at the 1984 Summer Paralympics
Medalists at the 1984 Summer Paralympics
Paralympic athletes of Great Britain